Joseph or Joe(y) Green may refer to:

Writers
Joseph Green (poet) (1706–1780), English Colonial wit, poet and clergyman
Joseph Greene (writer) (1914–1990), American science fiction author under the pen name Joe Green
Joseph L. Green (born 1931), American science fiction author
Joey Green (born 1958), American author
Joseph Green (fl. 1959), writer and director of the film The Brain That Wouldn't Die

Professionals
Joseph Green (merchant) (1727–1786), English merchant living in Königsberg and friend of Immanuel Kant
Joseph Green (Rabbi), Rosh Yeshiva (Dean) at Etz Chaim Yeshiva (London)
Joseph A. Green (1881–1963), United States Army general
Joseph C. Green, American ambassador
Joseph Frederick Green (1855–1932), British MP for Leicester West, 1918–1922
Joseph Henry Green (1791–1863), English surgeon and literary executor of Samuel Taylor Coleridge
Joseph I. Green, Jewish-American lawyer, politician, and judge from New York
Joseph John Green (1824–1903), South Australian leather merchant
Joseph Reynolds Green (1848–1914), English botanist, physiologist and chemist
Joe Green (entrepreneur) (fl. 2007), American social media entrepreneur

Sports
Joseph Green (footballer) (1870–1940), English footballer
Joseph Green (sportsman) (1846–1923), English cricketer and rugby union footballer
Joe Green (American football) (born 1948), American football defensive back
Joe Green (baseball, born 1878) (1878–1962), American baseball outfielder and manager
Joe Green (baseball, born 1897) (1897–1972), American baseball pinch hitter
Joe Green (footballer) (born 1995), English football goalkeeper
Joe Green (squash player) (born 1994), English squash player

Arts & entertainment
Joseph Green (actor) (1900–1996), Yiddish theater actor and film director
Joseph Green (producer) (1934–2017), Canadian theatre producer and university professor
Joe Green, drummer with the group Milburn
Joe Green, member of the Green Brothers Novelty Band

Other
Joseph Green (the Gauntlet), alter ego of the comic character Gauntlet
Joseph Green (Doctor Who), a character in the Doctor Who episode "Aliens of London"

"Joe Green", humorous English translation of the name of composer Giuseppe Verdi (1813–1901)

See also
Joseph Green Farmhouse, New York
Joseph Green House, Florida
Joseph Greene (disambiguation)